Sabana Llana may refer to:

Sabana Llana Norte, San Juan, Puerto Rico, a barrio
Sabana Llana Sur, San Juan, Puerto Rico, a barrio
Sabana Llana, Juana Díaz, Puerto Rico, a barrio